The Cayman Islands Hospital, also known locally as the George Town Hospital (GT Hospital), is the principal government hospital in the Cayman Islands, located in George Town on Grand Cayman. It is run by the Cayman Islands Health Services Authority.

History 
The hospital was completed in 1999.

Facilities 
The hospital is a two-storey facility with 124 beds and four operating theatres. Other facilities include an accident and emergency department, critical care unit, dialysis unit, pharmacy, laboratory and forensic unit.

Services 
The hospital provides services in most medical specialities.

References

External links 
 Official site

Buildings and structures in George Town, Cayman Islands
Hospitals in the Cayman Islands